Jakub Petružálek (born 24 April 1985) is a Czech professional ice hockey center playing for HC Litvínov of the Czech Extraliga (ELH).

Playing career
Petružálek played in his native Czech Republic with HC Litvínov of the Czech Extraliga, and in the Ontario Hockey League, before he was drafted by the New York Rangers, 266th overall in the 2004 NHL Entry Draft. He never played for the Rangers, who traded him to the Carolina Hurricanes along with a fifth-round conditional pick in the 2008 NHL Entry Draft (Tomáš Kubalík) for Brad Isbister.

On 15 May 2009, Jakub left the Hurricanes organization, having appeared in only 2 NHL games, and signed with Finnish club, Lukko Rauma, of the SM-liiga, for the 2009–10 season.  Petružálek moved to Amur Khabarovsk of the Russian-based Kontinental Hockey League for the 2011–12 season.

On 28 May 2014, Petruzalek signed a one-year contract with his fourth KHL club, Avtomobilist Yekaterinburg, for the 2014–15 season. Petruzalek had registered 4 goals and 16 points in 23 games when, for reasons of bereavement, he was given an immediate release from his contract with Avtomobilist on 19 November 2014 in order to return to Litvínov, Czech Republic.

Personal
While he was playing in Russia with Avtomobilist Yekaterinburg, Petruzalek's girlfriend of 5 years, fashion model and champion kickboxer Katerina Netolicka, was found dead in their apartment in Litvínov, Czech Republic on 12 November 2014. Petruzalek returned to the Czech Republic for the remainder of the season.

Career statistics

Regular season and playoffs

International

References

External links

 

1985 births
Living people
Albany River Rats players
Ak Bars Kazan players
Amur Khabarovsk players
Avtomobilist Yekaterinburg players
Barrie Colts players
Czech ice hockey right wingers
Carolina Hurricanes players
Charlotte Checkers (1993–2010) players
HC Dynamo Moscow players
Hartford Wolf Pack players
HC Litvínov players
Lukko players
HC Most players
HC Oceláři Třinec players
Örebro HK players
Ottawa 67's players
New York Rangers draft picks
People from Litvínov
Sportspeople from the Ústí nad Labem Region
Czech expatriate ice hockey players in Canada
Czech expatriate ice hockey players in the United States
Czech expatriate ice hockey players in Finland
Czech expatriate ice hockey players in Russia
Czech expatriate ice hockey players in Sweden